Naumovichi (Navumavičy) is a village located a few kilometers North of Grodno in Belarus. It has 266 inhabitants.

History
It was a royal village of the Polish–Lithuanian Commonwealth prior to the Partitions of Poland. It was again part of Poland in the interwar period, after the country regained independence in 1918.

During the German occupation of Poland (World War II), approximately 3,000 people including Jews were killed in this location by the Nazis. On July 13, 1943, the Germans murdered 50 Poles from the nearby town Lipsk at the site. Among those killed was Marianna Biernacka, one of the 108 Martyrs of World War II.

References

Grodno Governorate
Populated places in Grodno Region
Holocaust locations in Belarus